The 2012 Co-operative Funeralcare Scottish Women's Curling Championship was held from February 13 to 19 at the Dewars Centre in Perth, Scotland. It was held in conjunction with the 2012 Scottish Men's Curling Championship. The winner of the championship, Eve Muirhead, represented Scotland at the 2012 Ford World Women's Curling Championship in Lethbridge, Alberta, Canada.

Teams
The teams are as follows:

Round robin standings
Final Round Robin Standings

Round robin results
All times listed in Western European Time (UTC+0).

Draw 1
Monday, February 13, 1:00 pm

Draw 2
Monday, February 13, 8:45 pm

Draw 3
Tuesday, February 14, 12:00 pm

Draw 4
Tuesday, February 14, 8:00 pm

Draw 5
Wednesday, February 15, 8:00 am

Draw 6
Wednesday, February 15, 4:00 pm

Draw 7
Thursday, February 16, 9:00 am

Draw 8
Thursday, February 16, 4:00 pm

Draw 9
Friday, February 17, 12:00 pm

Playoffs

Semifinals
Saturday, February 18, 7:30 pm

Final
Sunday, February 19, 11:00 am

References

External links
Scottish Women's Curling Championship

2012 in curling
2012 in Scottish sport
Cham
Scottish Women's Curling Championship